Amanda Miller may refer to:

 Amanda Miller (cyclist), American professional road, MTB and cyclo-cross racer
 Amanda Miller (choreographer), Eurovision Young Dancers 2001 jurist
 Amanda Miller (ice dancer), juvenile ice dancer in the 2014 United States Figure Skating Championships
 Amanda C. Miller, voice actress
 Amanda and Jerad Miller, perpetrators of the 2014 Las Vegas shootings